A Woman of Fire (Arabic: امرأة من نار, French: femme de feu, translit: Imra' Min Nar or EMRA'A MEN NAR) is a 1971 Syrian film starring Salah Zulfikar and Nahed Yousri. The film is written and directed by Reda Mayser.

Synopsis 
Ahmed Lotfi is being chased by a group of people in Istanbul, but a girl named Turkan Abdel Hamid saves him from them. It turns out that she knew him, and a person named Shawkat told him that the reason for the chase was related to his brother Farid, who was being held by the Falcon Gang.

Crew 

 Writer: Reda Mayser
 Director: Reda Mayser
 Produced by: Qablawi Films – Zalat
 Distribution: Amal Film
 Cinematographer: Youssef Antar
 Editor: Reda Mayser

Cast

Primary cast 
 Salah Zulfikar in the role of Ahmed Lotfi
 Nahed Yousri in the role of Nazik/Turkan
 Ziyad Mawlawi in the role of Ziyad
 Adeeb Qaddoura in the role of Fahd

Supporting cast 
 Muhammad Khair Halawani
 Adnan Ajlouni
 George Amber
 Reza Al-Tayyar
 Uba Al-Halabi
 Mohamed Gomaa

See also 

 Egyptian cinema
 Cinema of Syria
 Arab cinema
 List of Syrian films
 Salah Zulfikar filmography

References

External links 

 A Woman of Fire on elCinema

 

1971 films
Syrian drama films